Jonathan Ira Lovett (born August 17, 1982) is an American podcaster, comedian, and former speechwriter. Lovett is a co-founder of Crooked Media, along with fellow former White House staffers during the Obama administration, Jon Favreau and Tommy Vietor. Lovett is a regular host of the Crooked Media podcasts Pod Save America and Lovett or Leave It. As a speechwriter, he worked for President Barack Obama as well as for Hillary Clinton when she was a United States senator and a 2008 presidential candidate. Lovett also co-created the NBC sitcom 1600 Penn, and was a writer and producer on the third season of HBO's The Newsroom.

Early life and education
Lovett was born in Woodbury, Long Island to a Reform Jewish family of Ukrainian ancestry that operated a box factory started by his grandfather. He attended Syosset High School. Lovett graduated from Williams College in 2004 with a degree in mathematics. His senior thesis, Rotating Linkages in a Normed Plane, led to a related publication on the same topic in American Mathematical Monthly. Lovett was  the 2004 Williams College class speaker at his commencement. After graduation, Lovett spent a year working as a paralegal and doing stand-up comedy on the side.

Political speechwriter

In 2004, Lovett volunteered for John Kerry's presidential campaign. He was asked to write a statement for the candidate, and his work led to an offer of a writing internship. Then, he briefly worked in Jon Corzine's Senate office. He was hired in 2005 to assist Sarah Hurwitz as a speechwriter for then-Senator Hillary Clinton, and he continued to write speeches for her through her 2008 presidential campaign.

When Clinton lost the 2008 Democratic primary contest, Lovett won an anonymous contest to write speeches for President Barack Obama in the White House. Lovett wrote speeches in the Obama administration for three years, working closely with Jon Favreau and David Axelrod. Prominent speeches that he wrote include policy speeches on financial reform and don't ask, don't tell, as well as remarks at the White House Correspondents' Dinner.

Lovett secretly officiated the first same-sex marriage in the White House, before the Obama administration supported same-sex marriage.

Media career

Television
Before Barack Obama ran for reelection, Lovett moved to California to become a screenwriter, citing a desire to write independently and focus on creative comedy full-time. Lovett collaborated with Josh Gad and Jason Winer on the television series 1600 Penn, of which Lovett was a co-creator, executive producer, and writer from 2012 until its cancellation in 2013. Lovett then worked as a writer, producer, and advisor on season three of HBO's The Newsroom. From 2012 to 2015, Lovett also contributed opinion pieces to venues like The Atlantic.

Crooked Media
Starting in March 2016, Lovett co-hosted The Ringer's political podcast Keepin' it 1600 with former fellow Obama staffers Jon Favreau, Dan Pfeiffer, and Tommy Vietor. The podcast was intended to cover the 2016 presidential race, and not expected to continue after that. But after the November 2016 election, Lovett, Favreau and Vietor wished to become engaged in politics again without having to leave Los Angeles or return to political campaigning. So they founded a liberal media company, Crooked Media, with the flagship podcast Pod Save America. Crooked Media, and Pod Save America in particular, has been compared to previous left-wing efforts like Air America to match America's Conservative talk radio, and Lovett has been characterized as providing comic relief to the programming. The company has since launched a range of podcasts, several of which regularly feature Lovett.

In March 2017, Lovett began hosting Lovett or Leave It, a panel show podcast produced by Crooked Media. The podcast, typically recorded in front of a live audience in Los Angeles, with Lovett and Crooked Media, embarked on national and international tours featuring live versions of both Pod Save America and Lovett or Leave It. Lovett was also involved in launching Crooked Media's voter recruitment and education project, Vote Save America.

Personal life
Lovett is gay. He and investigative journalist and author Ronan Farrow became romantically involved in 2011. In October 2019, Farrow published Catch and Kill, where he publicly announced their engagement; he had proposed to Lovett in an earlier draft of the book. However, in a March 2023 episode of his podcast, Lovett stated that he was single and had been exploring dating apps.

References

External links

1982 births
21st-century American male writers
21st-century American non-fiction writers
21st-century American screenwriters
American people of Ukrainian-Jewish descent
American Reform Jews
American male television writers
American mass media company founders
American podcasters
American speechwriters
American television writers
California Democrats
Crooked Media
American gay writers
American LGBT screenwriters
Jewish American writers
Gay Jews
Gay screenwriters
LGBT people from New York (state)
Living people
New York (state) Democrats
Obama administration personnel
People from Woodbury, Nassau County, New York
Screenwriters from California
Screenwriters from New York (state)
Syosset High School alumni
Television producers from California
Television producers from New York (state)
Williams College alumni
Writers from Los Angeles
Writers from New York (state)